Özgür Bayer (born 4 April 1979 in Balıkesir, Turkey) is a Turkish former football player.

References

1979 births
Living people
Sportspeople from Balıkesir
Turkish footballers
Turkey B international footballers
MKE Ankaragücü footballers
Kocaelispor footballers
Gaziantepspor footballers
Kayseri Erciyesspor footballers
Trabzonspor footballers
Denizlispor footballers
Boluspor footballers
Giresunspor footballers
Yimpaş Yozgatspor footballers
Ankaraspor footballers
Karşıyaka S.K. footballers
Süper Lig players

Association football defenders